Statistics of Qatar Stars League for the 1985–86 season.

Overview
Al-Rayyan Sports Club won the championship.

References
Qatar - List of final tables (RSSSF)

1985–86 in Asian association football leagues
1985–86 in Qatari football